A screening router performs packet-filtering and is used as a firewall. In some cases a screening router may be used as perimeter protection for the internal network or as the entire firewall solution.

References

See also
Access Control List
DMZ

Data security
Networking hardware
Computer network security